Jussie Smollett (born June 21, 1982) is an American actor and singer. He began his career as a child actor in 1991 debuting in The Mighty Ducks (1992). In 2015, Smollett portrayed musician Jamal Lyon in the Fox drama series Empire, a role that was hailed as groundbreaking for its positive depiction of a black gay man on television.

In January 2019, Smollett staged a fake hate crime against himself in Chicago and later made false police reports regarding the incident. In December 2021, Smollett was convicted of five felony counts of disorderly conduct; he was sentenced in March 2022 to 150 days in county jail. He has since been released on bond while his case is on appeal.

Early life
Jussie Smollett was born in Santa Rosa, California, to Joel and Janet (née Harris) Smollett. He has three brothers and two sisters: Jake, Jocqui, Jojo, Jurnee, and Jazz, several of whom are also actors. Smollett is biracial and Jewish. His mother is African-American, and his father is Jewish. He has said that his father would "kill you if you called him white". His father was absent from his life for a significant portion of his childhood. The family moved to the Elmhurst neighborhood of the New York City borough of Queens when he was two years old, then to Los Angeles when he was about seven. Smollett graduated from Paramus Catholic High School in Paramus, New Jersey. When he was 19, Smollett told his parents he was gay.

Career

Smollett began his acting career as a child model in New York City and later worked as an extra on the New York-shot movies Mo' Better Blues (1990) and New Jack City (1991) He went on to act in the films The Mighty Ducks (1992) and Rob Reiner's North (1994). On television, he starred alongside his five real-life siblings in the short-lived ABC sitcom On Our Own in 1994–1995. In 2012, Smollett returned to acting with the leading role in Patrik-Ian Polk's LGBT-themed comedy-drama The Skinny. Also that year, he released an EP titled The Poisoned Hearts Club. He later guest-starred on The Mindy Project (2012) and Revenge (2014).

In 2014, Smollett was cast as Jamal Lyon—a gay musician struggling to gain the approval of his father Lucious—opposite Taraji P. Henson and Terrence Howard in the Fox drama series Empire. His role was hailed as groundbreaking for its positive depiction of a black gay man on television. Smollett reprised his role in subsequent seasons and directed an episode of the fourth season in 2017.  Smollett's character was removed from the final two episodes of season five because of the assault controversy.

In February 2015, Smollett confirmed that he had signed a recording contract with Columbia Records and would be releasing an album in the future. Smollett co-wrote the songs "I Wanna Love You" and "You're So Beautiful" on the Original Soundtrack from Season 1 of Empire album, which was released in March 2015.

In June 2015, it was announced that Smollett would guest-star alongside his younger sister Jurnee in Underground, which aired in 2016. Smollett released his debut album, Sum of My Music, in March 2018. Sum of My Music is an R&B album that features elements of electronic music and hip hop. Smollett self-released it through his own label, Music of Sound.

On April 30, 2019, Fox Entertainment announced that though Smollett's contract had been extended for the sixth season of Empire, there were no plans for his character to appear during it.

Smollett directed B-Boy Blues, a movie based on the 1994 black gay novel by James Earl Hardy. The movie was released in November 2021.

2019 hate crime hoax

On January 29, 2019, Smollett told police that he was physically attacked outside his apartment building along with the use of racial and homophobic slurs. Smollett was treated at Northwestern Memorial Hospital was released "in good condition" later that morning.

Following a police investigation, on February 20, 2019, Smollett was charged by a grand jury with a class 4 felony for filing a false police report.  On March 26, 2019, all charges filed against Smollett were dropped. First Assistant State's Attorney Joseph Magats said the office reached a deal with Smollett's defense team in which prosecutors dropped the charges upon Smollett performing 16 hours of community service and forfeiting his $10,000 bond. On April 12, 2019, the city of Chicago filed a lawsuit in the Circuit Court of Cook County against Smollett for the costs, totaling $130,105.15, of overtime authorities expended investigating the hoax. In November 2019, Smollett filed a countersuit against the city of Chicago alleging he was the victim of "mass public ridicule and harm" and arguing he should not be made to reimburse the city for the cost of the investigation.

After the charges were dropped, allegations of favoritism and leniency were made against the prosecutor Kim Foxx. In June 2019, Foxx asked the state to conduct an independent inquiry by a special investigator. On February 11, 2020, after further investigation by a special prosecutor was completed, Smollett was indicted again by a Cook County grand jury on six counts of felony disorderly conduct about making four false police reports. On June 12, 2020, a judge rejected Smollett's claim that his February charge violated the principle of double jeopardy. His trial began in November 2021, and on December 9 Smollett was found guilty of five of the six counts.

On March 10, 2022, he was sentenced to serve 150 days in county jail and two and a half years on probation. Smollett was also ordered to make restitution to the city of Chicago of just over $120,000 and fined $25,000.  His lawyers filed a notice of appeal the following day. On March 16, 2022, an Illinois appeals court ordered that Smollett be released from jail, upon his posting of a $150,000 personal recognizance bond, pending the outcome of the appeal of his conviction.  On March 1, 2023, Smollett's attorney filed an appeal of his 150-day sentence related to the felony disorderly conduct conviction in his alleged hate crime hoax.

Personal life
Smollett publicly came out as gay during a televised interview with Ellen DeGeneres in March 2015. When Smollett's gay character from Empire engaged in a tryst with a female character, Smollett defended the plot development by stating that he and Empires co-creator Lee Daniels were trying to create a conversation about sexual fluidity in the gay community. While Daniels and Smollett are gay, Daniels has stated that they occasionally want to have sex with women.

In 2007 Smollett pleaded no contest to three misdemeanor counts providing false information to law enforcement resulting from a DUI stop in which he gave police a false name pretending to be his brother. Smollett also pleaded no contest to driving with a blood alcohol level over the legal limit and driving without a valid driver's license and was sentenced to a fine and three years of probation.

Filmography

Film

Television

Music videos

Awards and nominations

Discography

Albums

Extended plays

Singles

Notes

References

External links

 

1982 births
20th-century African-American male singers
20th-century American male actors
21st-century African-American male singers
21st-century American Jews
21st-century American male actors
21st-century American male singers
21st-century American singers
African-American Jews
African-American male actors
African-American male child actors
African-American-related controversies
African-American songwriters
American contemporary R&B singers
American male film actors
American male soap opera actors
American male television actors
Articles containing video clips
American gay actors
American gay musicians
Columbia Records artists
Hoaxers
Jewish American songwriters
Jewish singers
LGBT African Americans
LGBT Jews
LGBT people from California
Living people
Male actors from Santa Rosa, California
Paramus Catholic High School alumni
People convicted of making false statements
Sexually fluid men